Mnichov may refer to places:

Germany
 Munich, the capital of the German state of Bavaria, when referred to by its Czech and Slovak name 

Czech Republic
Mnichov (Cheb District), a municipality and village in the Karlovy Vary Region
Mnichov (Domažlice District), a municipality and village in the Plzeň Region
Mnichov (Strakonice District), a municipality and village in the South Bohemian Region
Mnichov, a village and administrative part of Libčeves in the Ústí nad Labem Region
Mnichov, a village and administrative part of Velké Chvojno in the Ústí nad Labem Region
Mnichov, a village and administrative part of Vrbno pod Pradědem in the Moravian-Silesian Region
Mírová, a municipality and village in the Karlovy Vary Region, known as Mnichov until 1955

See also
Mnichovice
Munich (disambiguation)